Silvia Domínguez Fernández (born 31 January 1987) is a Spanish basketball player for Perfumerías Avenida and the Spain women's national basketball team. She won three EuroLeague Women and multiple medals for Spain.

Club career
Domínguez played basketball from a very young age in school clubs in or around Barcelona and Badalona. She moved to Madrid to play for CB Estudiantes at 17, before being transferred to CB Avenida in 2006, becoming a key figure of the team as well as captain, winning the 2010–11 EuroLeague. She spent her next season at the other top Spanish of the moment, Ros Casares Valencia, winning the 2011–12 EuroLeague. She made history one season later, when playing for Russian club UMMC Ekaterinburg she won the 2012–13 EuroLeague, making it three in a row with three clubs.

She is back to play in Spain for Perfumerías Avenida since 2015.

EuroLeague and EuroCup statistics

National team
She played in Spain's youth teams from 2003 to 2007, making her debut with the senior team at 19 in 2006. In November 2021 she became the captain of the team, with 197 caps and 4.0 PPG:

 4th 2003 FIBA Europe Under-16 Championship for Women (youth)
  2004 FIBA Europe Under-18 Championship for Women (youth)
 5th 2005 FIBA Under-19 World Championship for Women (youth)
  2005 FIBA Europe Under-18 Championship for Women (youth)
 4th 2006 FIBA Europe Under-20 Championship for Women (youth)
  2007 FIBA Europe Under-20 Championship for Women (youth)
 8th 2006 World Championship
  2009 Eurobasket
 9th 2011 Eurobasket
  2013 Eurobasket
  2014 World Championship
  2015 Eurobasket
  2016 Summer Olympics
  2017 Eurobasket
  2018 World Championship
  2019 Eurobasket
 7th 2021 Eurobasket
 6th 2020 Summer Olympics

References

External links
 
 
 
 
 
 

1987 births
Living people
People from Maresme
Sportspeople from the Province of Barcelona
Point guards
Spanish women's basketball players
Basketball players from Catalonia
Basketball players at the 2016 Summer Olympics
Basketball players at the 2020 Summer Olympics
Medalists at the 2016 Summer Olympics
Olympic basketball players of Spain
Olympic medalists in basketball
Olympic silver medalists for Spain
Ros Casares Valencia players
Spanish expatriate basketball people in Russia